Markus Seikola (born June 5, 1982), is a professional Finnish ice hockey player. He is currently a defenceman for Ilves in the SM-liiga. Seikola was drafted in the 7th round, 209th overall, by the Toronto Maple Leafs during the 2000 NHL Entry Draft.

Career statistics

Regular season and playoffs

International

References

External links
 
 

1982 births
Living people
People from Laitila
Finnish ice hockey defencemen
Frölunda HC players
Ilves players
Lahti Pelicans players
Toronto Maple Leafs draft picks
HC TPS players
Sportspeople from Southwest Finland